Jordan first participated at the Paralympic Games in 1984, and has sent athletes to compete in every Summer Paralympic Games since then, with the exception of the 1992 Summer Paralympics. The nation has never participated in the Winter Paralympic Games.

Games

Medals by Summer Sport
Source:

Medallists

References